The Commercial District in Hardin, Montana is a  area roughly bounded by 4th, Crook, the Burlington Northern line, 1st and Crow Sts.  It was listed on the National Register of Historic Places in 1985.  It included 40 contributing buildings and two contributing structures.

References

External links

Historic districts on the National Register of Historic Places in Montana
National Register of Historic Places in Big Horn County, Montana
Neoclassical architecture in Montana